This is a list of episodes from the seventh season of Real Time with Bill Maher.

Episodes

Home release
This season is available for digital purchase on iTunes and Amazon Video.

References

External links 
 Real Time with Bill Maher Free (audio-only) episodes & Overtime podcast direct from HBO
 HBO.com Episode List
 TV.com Episode Guide
 

Real Time with Bill Maher
Real Time with Bill Maher seasons